POCL may refer to:

 Patriotic Old Comrades' League, a former political party in Myanmar.
 Premier Oil Company Limited, a former name of Pakistan State Oil
 Power over Camera Link, a Camera Link interface
  ("Portable Computing Language"), an OpenCL implementation that supports CPUs as well as certain GPUs and ASIPs
 , a high-speed rail project in France

See also
 Phosphoryl chloride (POCl3)